Nizhnyaya Salda is a town in Sverdlovsk Oblast, Russia, located on the Salda River (Ob's basin),  north of Yekaterinburg, the administrative center of the oblast. Population:

History
It was founded in 1760; town status was granted to it in 1938.

Administrative and municipal status
Within the framework of the administrative divisions, it is, together with five rural localities, incorporated as the Town of Nizhnyaya Salda—an administrative unit with the status equal to that of the districts. As a municipal division, the Town of Nizhnyaya Salda is incorporated as Nizhnyaya Salda Urban Okrug.

References

Notes

Sources

Cities and towns in Sverdlovsk Oblast
Verkhotursky Uyezd
Naukograds